Aurora Miranda da Cunha Richaid (20 April 1915 – 22 December 2005) was a Brazilian singer and actress. She began her career at the age of 18 in 1933. Miranda appeared in several films, including The Three Caballeros, where she danced with Donald Duck and José Carioca, singing the song, "Os Quindins de Yayá". Her sisters were Carmen Miranda and Cecilia Miranda.

Career

Aurora Miranda had a successful career in Brazil and the US, perhaps overshadowed by that of her sister, Carmen Miranda. Aurora was six years younger than her sister and equally talented and vivacious.

In 1932, aged 18, she was asked to perform on the Mayrink Veiga radio station by Josué de Barros, the same composer who had launched her sister's career 10 years earlier. Soon she was snapped up by a rival station and within 12 months she had released her first record, Cai, Cai, Balão ("Drop, Drop Balloon") alongside the crooner then considered Brazil's rei da voz or "king of the voice", Francisco Alves. Alves was known for supporting up-and-coming artists and there was none more promising than Aurora, who many still believe had a more beautiful voice than Carmen.

Years later, she appeared in the documentaries Once Upon a Mouse and Carmen Miranda: Bananas is My Business.

Miranda died at the age of 90 on 22 December 2005.

Personal life
In 1940 she married Gabriel Richaid clad in a gold-embroidered wedding dress shipped from the US by Carmen.

Unlike her sister, Aurora preferred married life to her career. In 1951 she returned to Rio and settled down as wife and mother. She often spoke of her sister Carmen and appeared in many documentaries.

Legacy 
Aurora Miranda carved out her own niche, first as a pioneering singer and later as one of the first human beings to interact with cartoons in a sound movie. She appeared in the Walt Disney production The Three Caballeros, a mix of cinema and animation in which Aurora starred alongside Donald Duck.

But perhaps her greatest legacy was the first recording of Rio de Janeiro's unofficial anthem, Cidade Maravilhosa (Marvellous City), in 1934.

Tom Philips wrote in The Guardian that Aurora Miranda "personified the spirit of Rio."

Filmography

See also 

 Carioca

References

External links

 
 

1915 births
2005 deaths
20th-century Brazilian actresses
Brazilian people of Portuguese descent
Carmen Miranda
20th-century Brazilian women singers
20th-century Brazilian singers